Phil Abraham is an American cinematographer and television director. He worked on all six seasons of The Sopranos, initially as a camera operator, then as a cinematographer and eventually as an episodic director. He won the 2008 Primetime Emmy Award for Outstanding Cinematography for a One Hour Series  for his work on the pilot of Mad Men and has been nominated for four other Primetime Emmy Awards for Outstanding Cinematography for a Single-Camera Series for his work on The Sopranos. Besides working as a cinematographer for Mad Men, he has also worked as a director for fifteen episodes.  He picked up two more nominations for a Primetime Emmy Award for Outstanding Directing for a Drama Series for Mad Men episodes "The Jet Set" and "The Other Woman". He attended high school at York Preparatory School and graduated from Wesleyan University, along with Mad Men creator Matthew Weiner.

Filmography

Director

Cinematographer

Camera operator

References

External links
 

American cinematographers
American television directors
Living people
Wesleyan University alumni
Place of birth missing (living people)
Year of birth missing (living people)